A list of films produced by the Israeli film industry in 1985.

1985 releases

Unknown premiere date

Awards

See also
1985 in Israel

References

External links
 Israeli films of 1985 at the Internet Movie Database

Israeli
Film
1985